Judge Her Not is a 1921 American silent Western film directed by George Edwardes-Hall and starring Jack Livingston, Pauline Curley and Harry von Meter.

Cast
 Jack Livingston as Ned Hayes
 Pauline Curley as May Harper
 Viola Dolan as Goldy Spencer
 Noel Kennon as Spuds
 Harry von Meter as Rob Ferris
 Hector Dion as Henry Don
 Florence Murth as Jane Don
 Ruth Wunderlich as Meg
 Helen Gilmore as Jerusha Spriggins
 Harriet Jackson as Anastasia Hooper (gossiper)
 Howard Crampton as Ogden Holmes
 William White as Zach Tuttle

References

Bibliography
 Connelly, Robert B. The Silents: Silent Feature Films, 1910-36, Volume 40, Issue 2. December Press, 1998.
 Munden, Kenneth White. The American Film Institute Catalog of Motion Pictures Produced in the United States, Part 1. University of California Press, 1997.

External links
 

1921 films
1921 Western (genre) films
American silent feature films
Silent American Western (genre) films
American black-and-white films
1920s English-language films
Films directed by George Edwardes-Hall
1920s American films